Meijsing is a surname. Notable people with the surname include:

Doeschka Meijsing (1947–2012), Dutch novelist
Geerten Meijsing (born 1950), Dutch writer, translator, and novelist

See also
Lucas Meijs (born 1963), Dutch organizational theorist